Lynne may refer to:

Lynne (surname)
Lynne (given name)
Lynne, Florida, an unincorporated community
Lynne, Wisconsin, a town in Oneida County, Wisconsin, United States